Executive Order 13990, officially titled Protecting Public Health and the Environment and Restoring Science to Tackle the Climate Crisis is an executive order signed by President Joe Biden on January 20, 2021, which implements various environmental policies of his administration including revoking the permit for the Keystone XL Pipeline and temporarily prohibiting drilling in the arctic refuge.

Provisions 
The order declares that it is the policy of the Biden Administration to: 
follow scientific means to advance Public Health and the Environment; 
mandates a review of the actions and policies of all federal agencies taken during the Trump administration to ensure compliance with the administration's environmental policies;
directs a review of the size and location of various federal lands; 
places a temporary moratorium on the Coastal Plain Oil and Gas Leasing Program; 
requires an accounting of the benefits of reducing climate pollution; 
revokes the permit for the Keystone XL pipeline; 
re-establish the Interagency Working Group on the Social Cost of Greenhouse Gases co-chaired by the Council of Economic Advisers Chair, the Office of Management and Budget Director, and the Office of Science and Technology Policy Director;
revokes or reinstates various Executive Orders.

The order was one of fifteen signed during the first day of the Biden administration.

Reactions 
Climate experts like Rachel Cleetus and Jonna Hamilton praised the order.

Many politicians from the Republican Party criticized the order.

Litigation

Louisiana v. Biden (2022)
On February 11, 2022, Western Louisiana U.S. District Court Judge James D. Cain Jr. issued a preliminary injunction in Louisiana v. Biden (2022) in favor of the plaintiffs to block federal agency requirements to assess the social costs of greenhouse gas emissions in regulatory actions under the order. On March 16, the U.S. 5th Circuit Court of Appeals stayed the decision following an appeal by the U.S. Justice Department, and on May 26, the U.S. Supreme Court issued an order without comment or opposition dismissing an appeal filed by the plaintiffs to vacate the 5th Circuit Court of Appeals decision.

Missouri v. Biden (2022)
On August 31, 2021, Eastern Missouri U.S. District Court Judge Audrey G. Fleissig issued an order dismissing a request filed by the plaintiffs in Missouri v. Biden (2022) for a preliminary injunction to block federal agency requirements to assess the social costs of greenhouse gas emissions in regulatory actions under the order. On September 3, the plaintiffs filed an appeal with the U.S. 8th Circuit Court of Appeals. Oral arguments were held on June 16, 2022.

See also 
 List of executive actions by Joe Biden

References

External links 
 
 
 
 
 
 
 
 
 
 

2021 in American law
Executive orders of Joe Biden
January 2021 events in the United States